Maxence Idesheim (born 8 July 1974) is a French snowboarder. He competed in the men's giant slalom event at the 1998 Winter Olympics.

References

1974 births
Living people
French male snowboarders
Olympic snowboarders of France
Snowboarders at the 1998 Winter Olympics
Sportspeople from Quimper
20th-century French people